The arrondissement of Le Marin is an arrondissement in the French overseas region of Martinique. It has 12 communes.

Composition

The communes of the arrondissement of Le Marin, and their INSEE codes, are:

 Les Anses-d'Arlet (97202)
 Le Diamant (97206)
 Ducos (97207)
 Le François (97210)
 Le Marin (97217)
 Rivière-Pilote (97220)
 Rivière-Salée (97221)
 Sainte-Anne (97226)
 Sainte-Luce (97227)
 Saint-Esprit (97223)
 Les Trois-Îlets (97231)
 Le Vauclin (97232)

History

The arrondissement of Le Marin, containing 12 communes that were previously part of the arrondissement of Fort-de-France, was created in 1974.

Before 2015, the arrondissements of Martinique were subdivided into cantons. The cantons of the arrondissement of Le Marin were, as of January 2015:

 Les Anses-d'Arlet
 Le Diamant
 Ducos
 Le François 1st Canton Nord
 Le François 2nd Canton Sud
 Le Marin
 Rivière-Pilote
 Rivière-Salée
 Sainte-Anne
 Sainte-Luce
 Saint-Esprit
 Les Trois-Îlets
 Le Vauclin

References

Le Marin